Thomas Dore (9 January 1658 – 1705) was  M.P. for Lymington, Hampshire, England from 1690 to 1705.

Burrard was born at Lymington, the son of Philip Dore. He was educated at Trinity College, Oxford.  In 1681 he married Elianor, daughter of John Button, M.P.: they had one son and one daughter.

Dore was appointed a Freeman of Lymington in 1681 and was Mayor from 1683 to 1685. A soldier, he served in the Duke of Bolton's Second Regiment, Sir John Gibson's Regiment of Foot and Lord Lucas's Regiment of Foot. In 1705 he was appointed a Freeman of Winchester.

References 

Alumni of Trinity College, Oxford
People from Lymington
17th-century English politicians
English MPs 1690–1695
English MPs 1695–1698
English MPs 1698–1700
English MPs 1701–1702
English MPs 1702–1705
1658 births
1705 deaths
17th-century English soldiers
34th Regiment of Foot officers
28th Regiment of Foot officers
Members of the Parliament of England (pre-1707) for Lymington